Events from the year 1594 in Sweden

Incumbents
 Monarch – Sigismund

Events

 - John III is buried. 
 - Sigismund is crowned. 
 - Vadstena Abbey is given a new Catholic priest.  
 - Sigismund leaves for his other Kingdom, Poland, and appoints his uncle Duke Charles regent in his absence.

Births

 1 September - Torsten Stålhandske, officer   (died 1644) 
 9 December - Gustavus Adolphus of Sweden, monarch   (died 1632) 
 - Stormor i Dalom, vicar's wife and matriarch   (died 1657)

Deaths

References

 
Years of the 16th century in Sweden
Sweden